Tangla sectinotalis is a moth in the family Crambidae. It was described by George Hampson in 1898. It is found in New Guinea.

References

Moths described in 1898
Pyraustinae